George Bouchier or Bourchier (died 1643) was a wealthy merchant of Bristol who supported the royalist cause during the English Civil War.

Bourchier entered into a plot with Robert Yeamans, who had been one of the sheriffs of Bristol, and several others, to deliver that city, on 7 March 1643, to Prince Rupert, for the service of King Charles I; but the scheme being discovered and frustrated, he was, with Yeamans, after eleven weeks' imprisonment, brought to trial before a council of war. They were both found guilty and hanged, drawn and quartered in Wine Street, Bristol, on 30 May 1643.

In his speech to the populace at the place of execution Bouchier exhorted all those who had set their hands to the plough (meaning the defence of the royal cause) not to be terrified by his and his fellow-prisoner's sufferings into withdrawing their exertions in the king's service. There is a small portrait of Bouchier in the preface to William Winstanley's Loyall Martyrology, 1665.

Notes

References

Attribution
 The following are referenced in the DNB article:
Clarendon's Hist. of the Rebellion (1843), 389;
Lloyd's Memoires (1677), 565;
Winstanley's Loyall Martyrology, 5;
Granger's Biog. Hist. of England (1824), iii. 110;
'Barrett's Hist. of Bristol, 227, 228.

Further reading
 quotes at length 

Year of birth missing
1643 deaths
Cavaliers
English merchants
Executed people from Bristol
People killed in the English Civil War
People executed by Stuart England by hanging, drawing and quartering